Péter Tereánszki-Tóth, later Péter Jakab (12 December 1980 – 15 September 2020), was a Hungarian football player who played in the Nemzeti Bajnokság I, Nemzeti Bajnokság II, Austrian Regionalliga East, and the Canadian Soccer League.

Playing career 
Tereánszki-Tóth began his career in 2002 with Videoton FC in the Nemzeti Bajnokság I. Throughout his tenure with Videoton he featured in the 2003 UEFA Intertoto Cup against FC Marek Dupnitsa. He later had stints with Kaposvári Rákóczi FC, and BFC Siófok in the Nemzeti Bajnokság II. In 2009, he played abroad in Austria with SC Ostbahn XI, and later with USV Scheiblingkirchen-Warth, and USC Kirchschlag.

In 2010, he played overseas in the Canadian Soccer League with Hamilton Croatia. During his stint with Hamilton he would feature in the CSL Championship match against Brantford Galaxy, but were defeated 3–0.

Personal life 
Tereánszki-Tóth later changed his name to Péter Jakab. On 4 September 2020, he requested a blood donation for a life-saving surgery. After receiving the necessary blood transfusion for his illness his conditions failed to improve and he died on 15 September 2020.

References 

1980 births
2020 deaths
Sportspeople from Székesfehérvár
Hungarian footballers
Association football defenders
Fehérvár FC players
Kaposvári Rákóczi FC players
Place of death missing
BFC Siófok players
Százhalombattai LK footballers
SC Ostbahn XI players
Hungarian expatriate footballers
Expatriate footballers in Austria
Expatriate soccer players in Canada
Hungarian expatriate sportspeople in Austria
Hungarian expatriate sportspeople in Canada
Hamilton Croatia players
Nemzeti Bajnokság I players
Canadian Soccer League (1998–present) players
Nemzeti Bajnokság II players